Summer of 8 is a 2016 American comedy-drama film written and directed by Ryan Schwartz.  It is Schwartz's directorial debut.

Premise
Eight close friends soak up their last day of summer together on the beach before parting ways for college.

Cast
Carter Jenkins as Jesse
Shelley Hennig as Lily Hunter
Matt Shively as Oscar
Natalie Hall as Jen
Michael Grant as Aiden
Bailey Noble as Serena
Nick Marini as Bobby
Rachel DiPillo as Emily
Sonya Walger as Diane

Production
The film was shot in Newport Beach, California.

References

External links
 
 

American comedy-drama films
2016 films
Films shot in California
Orion Pictures films
2016 comedy-drama films
2016 directorial debut films
2010s English-language films
2010s American films